Scotty Granger (born July 19, 1987) also known as Scotty Grand and Scotty G, is an American Pop, R&B, Contemporary Music Producer/Singer/Songwriter. He plays piano, guitar, flute, sax, and piccolo, among others.

Granger has famously been linked to having received his talents and voice, specifically, via his Great Aunt being, “Queen of Gospel Music” Mahalia Jackson.

After renaming himself Scotty Grand in 2011, he embarked on a solo singing career. And in November of that same year, signed a publishing deal with Sony/ATV Music Publishing.

He has written a number of dance tunes, mainly destined for European dance circuits, but gained fame with the American music market after taking part in Platinum Hit on Bravo and finishing third overall in the competition - though being a fan favorite.

In 2021, Grand, became part of the songwriting team that penned the theme song for ABC’s reboot of The Wonder Years. Titled “All I Know”, it has gone on to win awards such as an HMMA (Hollywood Music in Media Award).

Career
He started singing and taking part in musical competitions when he was 7 years old. In 1998, he appearing on his first televised show from the Apollo Theatre in Harlem, NY, where he won between 10 participating kids. He released his debut album titled Revelations of Music on New Orleans- based label, Jam Tight Records.

In 2004, while still in high school, he released his second album So Natural with Poetik Arkhitekture Inc. that included the 2005 class song for his high school "Class Dismissed" which he performed at the graduation.

In the summer of 2006, at 18 years, he appeared on another reality TV show titled The One: Making a Music Star on ABC, becoming the youngest participant in the show.

He studied at Berklee College of Music in Boston, Massachusetts, then moved to Los Angeles. Scotty began touring with Jordin Sparks' back in 2007 performing and acting as Creative Director for her live shows as well as backing her on keyboards and vocals including at Sparks' Battlefield Tour.

During the summer of 2008 he released his writing debut single internationally in the dance music/techno genre with "A Higher Love" charting on various European dance charts. His works have appeared in mixes and dance compilations albums selling over platinum status in more than 6 countries. Mr. Grand has acted as music producer/songwriter in international dance hits like DJ Jose's "Like That", DJ Antoine's Live It Alive" and "Monday, Tuesday, Wednesday" and Hi Tack's "I Don't Mind" and Roy Gate's "I Am Music".

On June 10, 2009, he appeared as "Scotty 'Songbird' Granger" on the ABC show Wipeout in Episode 4 The Sisterhood of the Travelling Hot Pants in season 2 of the show and the first person who was able to cross the Sweeper Run successfully. He won $50,000.

He took part in Platinum Hit songwriting competition (see below). He released his third studio album A Songwriter's Right showcasing his songwriting talents in many genres including R&B, dance, pop and country.

In Platinum Hit
Granger was one of the 12 finalists on the 2011 series on Bravo entitled Platinum Hit, a competition about songwriting. He reached the finale (Final 3) and sang his own composition "Beautiful You" and came third overall behind winner Sonyae Elise and runner-up Jes Hudak.

Performances

After Platinum Hit
Scotty Granger continued his music career after finishing third in Platinum Hit taking the artistic name Scotty Grand. He released his album A Songwriter's Right in 2012 with an extended playlist under A Songwriter's Right - Paragraph One: Love Is... with the follow-up album A Songwriter's Right - Paragraph Two: Hate Will..., with notable collaboration with a number of artists and prominently with The Ben Leathers Orchestra. A Songwriter's Right - Paragraph Three is due in 2017 with a song a month released by Scotty Grand until date of release.

He worked as keyboard player and backing vocals for Jordin Sparks and eventually was assigned as a creative director for her in 2014. In 2015, he released his own single "If This Ain't Love" featuring The Ben Leathers Orchestra, and accompanied by a music video.

Personal life
He is the younger brother of former NBA basketball player Danny Granger and great nephew of gospel legend, Mahalia Jackson. Scotty is an openly gay artist.

Discography

Albums
as Scotty Granger
Revelations of Music [Jam Tight Records]
So Natural [Poetik Arkhitekture Inc.] (2004)

as Scotty Grand

Singles
as Scotty Granger
2011: "Beautiful You" (as Scotty Granger during Platinum Hit)

as Scotty Grand
2013: "If This Ain't Love" (featuring The Ben Leathers Orchestra) [When Words Fail Records]
2014: "Where We Belong" [When Words Fail Records]
2021: “All I Know”(The Wonder Years Theme Song” ABC [Hollywood Records]

Videography
2015; "If This Ain't Love"

References

External links
 Musiqman18 YouTube page

1987 births
Living people
Singers from Louisiana
Songwriters from Louisiana
Record producers from Louisiana
LGBT African Americans
American LGBT songwriters
American LGBT singers
Gay singers
Gay songwriters
LGBT people from Louisiana
LGBT record producers
American gay musicians
Musicians from New Orleans
21st-century American male singers
21st-century American singers
20th-century LGBT people
21st-century LGBT people
21st-century African-American male singers
American male songwriters
American gay writers